WBUE-LP (96.1 FM, "The Path") was a Christian radio station broadcasting a Contemporary Christian music format. Licensed to Columbus, Georgia, United States, the station served the Columbus, Georgia area. The station was last owned by Calvary Christian Life Ministries, Inc.

The station's license was surrendered to the Federal Communications Commission on August 16, 2022, who cancelled it the same day.

References

External links
 

BUE-LP
BUE-LP
Defunct radio stations in the United States
Defunct religious radio stations in the United States
Radio stations established in 2005
Radio stations disestablished in 2022
2005 establishments in Georgia (U.S. state)
2022 disestablishments in Georgia (U.S. state)
BUE-LP